"This Is How We Roll" is a song recorded by American country music duo Florida Georgia Line with fellow country music singer Luke Bryan. It is the fifth and final single from Florida Georgia Line's debut studio album, Here's to the Good Times, although it is only included on the 2013 This Is How We Roll re-release. Cole Swindell assisted the artists in writing the song. A remix, featuring Jason Derulo and Bryan was released on June 7, 2014.

Critical reception
In a review of the album's rerelease, Matt Bjorke of Roughstock wrote that it is a "song which is definitely well within the musical pocket each of the song’s writers have in their music and an obvious choice for single at some point. It’s another sing-a-long, small town love type of song but does that matter at this point, it’s a song that’s all about feeling good with people you love to be with." Website Taste of Country also reviewed the song favorably, saying that "‘Get Your Shine On,’ ‘Round Here’ and ‘Stay’ have found success on country radio, but this track from the group’s deluxe edition of ‘Here’s to the Good Times’ is their best moment since ‘Cruise.’ They can get away with the rapping now, and having the stamp of approval from country’s reigning ACM Entertainer of the Year certainly won’t hurt."

Music video
The music video was directed by Marc Klasfeld and premiered in March 2014.

A biker named Kenny loses a bet and has to jump a tree. He fails, resulting in his dirt bike being stuck in the tree. When he, Travis Pastrana and other men are found stranded by Hubbard, Kelley, and Bryan as a result of the failed dirt bike trick, Kelley invites them to a party in the back of their semi truck, which is revealed throughout the video to consist of dancing women and beer. The trio can be seen both inside and on top of the truck as it travels. Towards the end of the video, dirt bikers perform tricks as they fly over the trio, who are standing on solid ground.

Commercial performance 
The song first entered the Billboard Hot 100 chart at number 75, and at number 18 on the Hot Country Songs  chart and sold 52,000 digital copies for the week when the deluxe version of the album, Here's To The Good Times...This Is How We Roll, was released on November 25, 2013. It reached number one on the Hot Country Songs chart for the week ending of March 28, 2014 and stayed at number one for four weeks. It also peaked on the Billboard Hot 100 chart at number 15 for the week ending of April 26, 2014. After it was released to radio, the song received significant airplay to enter the Country Airplay chart at number 25 for the week ending of March 1, 2014. It continued climbing the chart and peaked at number 2 in May 2014, behind Bryan's own "Play It Again", marking the first time in the chart's 24-year history that the same artist held the top two positions simultaneously.

The song reached its first million sales mark in April 2014, and its second in September 2014. It was certified Platinum by the RIAA on May 1, 2014, double Platinum on September 16, 2014, and quintuple Platinum on December 12, 2018. As of January 2015, the song has sold 2,276,000 copies in the US.

The song is featured in the video game WWE 2K15.

Live Performances 
A mashup of the song with Jason Derulo's Talk Dirty was performed with Derulo at the 2014 CMA Awards.

Charts and certifications

Weekly charts

Certifications

Year-end charts

Decade-end charts

Release history

See also
List of number-one country singles of 2014 (U.S.)

References

2014 singles
Florida Georgia Line songs
Jason Derulo songs
Luke Bryan songs
Songs written by Cole Swindell
Songs written by Luke Bryan
Song recordings produced by Joey Moi
Republic Records singles
Republic Nashville singles
Music videos directed by Marc Klasfeld
2012 songs
Songs written by Tyler Hubbard
Songs written by Brian Kelley (musician)
Billboard Hot Country Songs number-one singles of the year
Vocal collaborations